The Lobatse hinge-back tortoise or Lobatse hinged tortoise (Kinixys lobatsiana) is a species of turtle in the family Testudinidae. It is found in Southern Africa.

Description

Range and habitat
This species is endemic to Southern Africa and is found in South Africa and Botswana. More specifically, it is restricted to northern South Africa and southeastern Botswana.

References

Further reading
 Photo of Kinixys lobatsiana
 Photo of Kinixys lobatsiana
 Britishcheloniagroup.org.uk

Kinixys
reptiles described in 1927
reptiles of Botswana
reptiles of South Africa
taxa named by John Hyacinth Power
turtles of Africa